Watergardens may refer to:

 Watergardens Town Centre, a major shopping centre, Sydenham, Victoria, Australia
 Watergardens railway station, a railway station adjacent to Watergardens, in Melbourne

 Fort Worth Water Gardens, Texas

See also
 Water garden or aquatic garden